Lutheran Indian Mission (Immanuel Mohican Lutheran Church) is a historic church in Gresham, Wisconsin, United States.  The Mission church and school was built in 1901 by the Lutheran Church–Missouri Synod to serve Stockbridge Indians. The school operated until 1958 and the church continues today.

References

Churches in Shawano County, Wisconsin
Lutheran churches in Wisconsin
Native American history of Wisconsin
Churches on the National Register of Historic Places in Wisconsin
Churches completed in 1902
Schools in Wisconsin
Lutheran Church–Missouri Synod churches
National Register of Historic Places in Shawano County, Wisconsin